The 2019 CONCACAF Boys' Under-15 Championship is an international football tournament, the third edition of the CONCACAF Boys' Under-15 Championship.

The competition was initially set to feature up to 39 teams from the CONCACAF region as well as three invited teams from UEFA; however, the withdrawal of Jamaica led to a total of 41 teams.

All times EDT (UTC−4).

Teams 
The 41 teams were divided in three divisions according to the Concacaf Men's Under-17 Ranking as of 2019.

Division 1 (16 teams)
 
  (invited from UEFA)
 
 
 
 
 
 
  (invited from UEFA)
 
 
 
  (invited from UEFA)
 
 
 

Division 2 (16 teams)
 
 
 
 
 
 
 
 
 
 
 
 
 
 
 
 

Division 3 (9 teams)

Venues
The competition took place at the IMG Academy in Bradenton, Florida, United States, the same venue as the previous edition.

Format
Each match shall last 70 minutes, comprising two periods of 35 minutes with an interval of 10 minutes in between. In the championship game, if the score is tied at the end of regulation time, two 10 minute overtime periods will be played. If the score is still tied at the end of overtime, kicks from the penalty mark shall be taken to determine the winner.

In Division 1, the 16 teams are divided into four groups (A to D) of four. After the group stage, the top two teams of each group advance to the quarter-finals, where the winners advance to the semi-finals and final. The remaining teams play in a final round classification match depending on their position.

In Division 2, the 16 teams are also divided into four groups (E to H) of four. After the group stage, each team play in a final round classification match depending on their position.

In Division 3, the 9 teams are divided into two groups (I and J), one of four and one of five. After the group stage, each team play in a final round classification match depending on their position.

Division 1

Group stage

Group A

Group B

Group C

Group D

Knockout stage

Knockout round

Bracket

Quarter-finals

Semi-finals

Final

Division 2

Group stage

Group E

Group F

Group G

Group H

Knockout stage

Knockout round

Bracket

Semi-finals

Final

Division 3

Group stage

Group I

Group J

Knockout stage

Knockout round

Final

References

External links
Under 15s – Boys, CONCACAF.com

CONCACAF competitions
Boys' Under-15 Championship
International association football competitions hosted by the United States
CONCACAF Boys' Under-15 Championship
CONCACAF Boys' Under-15 Championship
CONCACAF Boys' Under-15 Championship
Sports in Bradenton, Florida
CONCACAF Boys' Under-15 Championship